Sania Mirza and Mahesh Bhupathi were the defending champions, but decided not to participate together.
Mirza played alongside Robert Lindstedt, but lost in the first round to Cara Black and Aisam-ul-Haq Qureshi, while Bhupathi competed with Casey Dellacqua, but lost to Anastasia Rodionova and Santiago González in the first round.
Lucie Hradecká and František Čermák won the title, defeating Kristina Mladenovic and Daniel Nestor in the final, 1–6, 6–4, [10–6].

Seeds

Main draw

Finals

Top half

Bottom half

External links
 Main draw
2013 French Open – Doubles draws and results at the International Tennis Federation

Mixed Doubles
French Open by year – Mixed doubles